Pachista is a genus of moths in the family Geometridae described by Prout in 1912. It consists of only one species, Pachista superans, first described by Arthur Gardiner Butler in 1878, which is found in China, Japan and Korea.

Its wing pattern is grey brown with fine dark striations.

The larvae feed on Magnolia and Aesculus species. They are white-tinged green, fairly short, stout, but sometimes seem slightly flattened along the lateral ridge.

References

External links

Pseudoterpnini
Geometridae genera
Monotypic moth genera
Moths of Japan
Moths described in 1912
Taxa named by Louis Beethoven Prout
Moths of Asia